Alexander Engelhard (born 26 September 1972 in Ulm) is a German miller and politician for the CSU and a member of the Bundestag, the federal diet since 2021.

Life
Engelhard was born 1972 in the West German city of Ulm. Following his graduation from Technical High School in Ulm, Engelhard did an apprenticeship as a miller. After that he studied at the technical colleges in Neu-Ulm  and Ulm and received a degree in industrial engineering. In 2001, Engelhard took over the old family business (Engelhardmühle) in Weißenhorn-Attenhofen and converted it into one of first organic mills in Germany.

Engelhard is married and is the father of two daughters. He is of Roman Catholic denomination.

Politics
Engelhard was a member of the city council of Weißenhorn from 2002 to 2014 and has been a member of the district council of Neu-Ulm since 2002.

He ran unsuccessfully for a seat in the 2003 Bavarian state election.  

After the previous CSU incumbent Georg Nüßlein did not run again, Engelhard ran a direct candidate in the Neu-Ulm federal constituency in the 2021 federal election. He won the direct mandate with 37.2% of the first votes. In the Bundestag, Engelhard is a member of the Committee for the Environment, Nature Conservation, Nuclear Safety and Consumer Protection.

References

External links
 Private Website
 Biography at the German Bundestag

Living people
1972 births
People from Ulm
Christian Social Union in Bavaria politicians
Members of the Bundestag 2021–2025
21st-century German politicians
Members of the Bundestag for Bavaria
Businesspeople in the food industry
Businesspeople from Bavaria